Jason Tutt (born 15 May 1991) is a former professional Australian rules footballer who played for the Western Bulldogs and Carlton Football Club in the Australian Football League (AFL).

Originally from Canberra he played his junior football for Ainslie, Tutt was recruited to the Australian Football League by the Western Bulldogs with the number 31 draft pick in the 2009 AFL Draft. He made his AFL debut in Round 22, 2011 against Port Adelaide Football Club and kicked three goals with his first three kicks. Tutt spent five seasons at the Bulldogs, playing 26 senior games in that time. He won Victorian Football League premiership with the Footscray reserves in 2014 while at the club.

Tutt resigned from the Bulldogs at the end of the 2014 season, after arranging a move to the Carlton Football Club from 2015. Tutt received permission to train with Carlton in November 2014, and was formally recruited by the club in the 2015 pre-season draft. At the conclusion of the 2016 season, he was delisted by Carlton.

He is the nephew of ACT team of the century member and former Ainslie and South Adelaide player Alan Tutt.

Statistics

|- style="background-color: #EAEAEA"
! scope="row" style="text-align:center" | 2010
|
| 34 || 0 || — || — || — || — || — || — || — || — || — || — || — || — || — || —
|-
! scope="row" style="text-align:center" | 2011
|
| 34 || 3 || 5 || 3 || 37 || 23 || 60 || 17 || 7 || 1.7 || 1.0 || 12.3 || 7.7 || 20.0 || 5.7 || 2.3
|- style="background-color: #EAEAEA"
! scope="row" style="text-align:center" | 2012
|
| 15 || 5 || 2 || 1 || 27 || 17 || 44 || 14 || 7 || 0.4 || 0.2 || 5.4 || 3.4 || 8.8 || 2.8 || 1.4
|-
! scope="row" style="text-align:center" | 2013
|
| 15 || 11 || 5 || 8 || 86 || 38 || 124 || 25 || 16 || 0.5 || 0.7 || 7.8 || 3.5 || 11.3 || 2.3 || 1.5
|- style="background:#eaeaea;"
! scope="row" style="text-align:center" | 2014
|
| 15 || 7 || 10 || 3 || 67 || 33 || 100 || 14 || 32 || 1.4 || 0.4 || 9.6 || 4.7 || 14.3 || 2.0 || 4.6
|-
! scope="row" style="text-align:center" | 2015
|
| 22 || 13 || 4 || 5 || 128 || 90 || 218 || 55 || 35 || 0.3 || 0.4 || 9.8 || 6.9 || 16.8 || 4.2 || 2.7
|- style="background:#eaeaea;"
! scope="row" style="text-align:center" | 2016
|
| 22 || 1 || 1 || 0 || 10 || 8 || 18 || 4 || 4 || 1.0 || 0.0 || 10.0 || 8.0 || 18.0 || 4.0 || 4.0
|- class="sortbottom"
! colspan=3| Career
! 40
! 27
! 20
! 355
! 209
! 564
! 129
! 101
! 0.7
! 0.5
! 8.9
! 5.2
! 14.1
! 3.2
! 2.5
|}

See also
List of first kick/first goal kickers in the Australian Football League

References

External links

1991 births
Living people
Western Bulldogs players
Australian rules footballers from the Australian Capital Territory
NSW/ACT Rams players
Ainslie Football Club players
Carlton Football Club players
Preston Football Club (VFA) players
Williamstown Football Club players